Anthony Morton Solomon (December 27, 1919 – January 15, 2008) was Undersecretary of the Treasury for Monetary Affairs during the Carter administration, and President of the Federal Reserve Bank of New York between 1980 and 1984.

Early life and education
Born in Arlington, New Jersey, Solomon was educated at the University of Chicago, receiving a B.A. in economics in 1941. He later received his masters and doctorate degrees from Harvard University in, respectively, 1948 and 1950.

Career
Solomon‘s affiliation with government service began with an appointment by President Franklin Roosevelt to be a consultant on economic affairs in Iran.  When he was drafted into the Army, a letter from the President's office excused him. Under John F. Kennedy he headed an economic group scouting the Trust Territory of Micronesia in the early 1960s.

Solomon served as Assistant Secretary of State for Economic Affairs in the Johnson administration between 1965 and 1969, and again as Undersecretary of the Treasury for Monetary Affairs from 1977 to 1980. During the Carter administration he helped organize the freezing of Iranian assets following Ayatollah Ruhollah Khomeini's overthrow of Shah Mohammad Reza Pahlavi.

He was appointed President of the Federal Reserve Bank of New York on January 21, 1980.

Personal life
Solomon was a major donor to the Peterson Institute in 2006. He died of kidney failure on January 18, 2008.

References

External links
Anthony M. Solomon at the Federal Reserve Bank of New York website

1919 births
2008 deaths
20th-century American economists
Deaths from kidney failure
Economists from New Jersey
Economists from New York (state)
Federal Reserve Bank of New York presidents
Harvard University alumni
People from Kearny, New Jersey
University of Chicago alumni